Rubai is the second album of Irish folk band, Flook, released in 2002 under Flatfish Records.

Track listing

See also
 Ed Boyd
Brian Finnegan
Flook

References

External links
Flook

2002 albums
Flook (band) albums